This is the Edwin Kantar bibliography.

Edwin Kantar is a  bridge player and writer with over 35 bridge books written since 1960; he is a regular contributor to the ACBL Bridge Bulletin, The Bridge World, and Bridge Today. In a survey of bridge writers and players, Complete Defensive Bridge Play was among the top 10 of all-time favorite bridge books. Kanter won the American Bridge Teachers Association (ABTA) award for Best Book of the Year four times.

References

External links
 
 List of Kantar's books at Bridge Guys
 

Contract bridge books
Contract bridge writers
Bibliographies by writer